Austin Dummett (17 February 1923 – 3 November 1984) was a Guyanese cricketer. He played in two first-class matches for British Guiana in 1943/44.

See also
 List of Guyanese representative cricketers

References

External links
 

1923 births
1984 deaths
Guyanese cricketers
Guyana cricketers
Sportspeople from Georgetown, Guyana